R v Hughes is a 2002 Judicial Committee of the Privy Council (JCPC) case in which it was held that it was unconstitutional in Saint Lucia for capital punishment to be the mandatory sentence for murder. The JCPC held that because the Constitution of Saint Lucia prohibits "inhuman or degrading punishment", following a murder conviction, a trial judge must have discretion to impose a lesser penalty than death by hanging; capital punishment may be applied only in those cases that contain aggravating factors as compared to other murder cases.

The case was decided with Reyes v R and Fox v R, cases on the same issue on appeal from Belize and Saint Kitts and Nevis.

See also
Bowe v R
Boyce v R
Matthew v S

External links
R v Hughes, bailii.org

2002 in case law
2002 in Saint Lucia
Death penalty case law
Judicial Committee of the Privy Council cases on appeal from Saint Lucia
Prisoners sentenced to death by Saint Lucia
Murder in Saint Lucia